Lingtai County is a county in the southeast of Gansu province, China, bordering Shaanxi province to the south and east. It is under the administration of Pingliang City. Its postal code is 744400, and in 1999 its population was 226,576 people. It was first established in 605 AD.

Lingtai is named after the Lingtai acupuncture point, since one of the founders of acupuncture, Huangfu Mi, was born in Lingtai. In ancient history it was known as Mixu.

Administrative divisions
Lingtai County is divided to 1 Subdistricts, 9 towns 4 townships and 1 other.
Subdistricts
 Chengshi residential community

Towns

Townships

Others
 Wanbaochuan Farm()

Climate

Born in Lingtai 

 Huangfu Mi, author and physician
 Niu Sengru, government official

See also
 List of administrative divisions of Gansu

References

 Official website (Chinese)

Lingtai County
Pingliang